Melanie Jayne Chisholm (born 12 January 1974), better known as Melanie C or Mel C, is an English singer-songwriter and media personality. As one of the five members of the Spice Girls, she was nicknamed Sporty Spice.

She rose to fame in 1996, releasing, in two years with the Spice Girls, two consecutive number-one albums, eight number-one singles from nine worldwide hits, the biggest-selling debut single of all time and the biggest-selling album in music history by a girl group, respectively with "Wannabe" atop in 37 countries with over seven million records, and Spice, which peaked at number one in more than 17 countries across the world, with over 31 million copies, as well as the second album Spiceworld with more than 20 million copies sold. Chisholm began her solo career in late 1998 by singing with Canadian rock singer Bryan Adams, and her solo debut album Northern Star was released in 1999, reaching number one in Sweden and number 4 on the UK Albums Chart. It was certified internationally with seven platinum and three gold certifications, including the triple-Platinum by the British Phonographic Industry, selling over 4 million copies worldwide, and becoming the best selling solo album of any Spice Girls member.

After releasing her second album, Reason, in 2004, Chisholm left Virgin and founded her own record company, Red Girl Records. Beautiful Intentions, her third album, released in 2005, spent 9 weeks at number one in Portugal and spawned international hit singles, selling over 1.5 million copies worldwide with several international certifications. Her fourth studio album, This Time, was released in 2007. Of the five singles released from the album, the first three went to number one in Portugal. In December, Chisholm reunited with the Spice Girls to release a greatest hits album supported by a world tour. She released her fifth solo album, The Sea, in 2011, her first EP The Night in 2012, the sixth studio album Stages, in 2012, and seventh album, Version of Me (2016). Her eponymous eighth studio album was released in 2020.

Having co-written 11 UK number-ones, more than any other female artist in chart history, she remains the only female performer to top the charts as a solo artist, as part of a duo, quartet and quintet. With twelve UK number-one singles, including the charity single as part of The Justice Collective, she is the second female artist – and the first British female artist – with most singles at number one in the United Kingdom, and with a total of fourteen songs that have received the number one in Britain (including the double A-sides), Chisholm is the female artist with most songs at number one in the UK ranking history. Her work has earned her several awards and nominations, including a Guinness Book mention, three World Music Awards, five Brit Awards from 10 nominations, three American Music Awards, four Billboard Music Awards from six nomination, eight Billboard special awards, three MTV Europe Music Awards from seven nominations, one MTV Video Music Awards from two nomination, ten ASCAP awards, one Juno Award from two nominations, and four nominations at the Echo Awards.

Since 1996, Chisholm has sold more than 123 million records, including 100 million copies with the group, and 23 million solo albums, singles and collaborations, and has earned over 326 worldwide certifications (with numerous diamonds), including 41 silver, gold and platinum certifications as a solo artist. Chisholm's autobiography, Who I Am: My Story, was released on 15 September 2022.

Early life
Melanie Jayne Chisholm was born on 12 January 1974 in Whiston, Lancashire, the only daughter of Joan O'Neill, who worked as a secretary and personal assistant and has been singing in music bands since she was 14, and Alan Chisholm, a fitter at the Otis Elevator Company. Her parents married in 1971 and separated in 1978, when Chisholm was four years old. Her mother remarried and had more children, one of whom is racing driver Paul O'Neill, who was born when Chisholm was six years old. She grew up in Widnes, Cheshire, attending Brookvale Junior School in nearby Runcorn and Fairfield High School in Widnes. Following school, she studied for a diploma course in singing, dancing ,  and musical theatre at the Doreen Bird College of Performing Arts in London. During college, she replied to an advert in The Stage placed by Chris and Bob Herbert, who were looking to form a new girl group, later to become the Spice Girls. She left college just short of completing her three-year course, and gained teaching qualifications in tap and modern theatre dance with the Imperial Society of Teachers of Dancing.

Career

1994–2000: Spice Girls

In 1994, Chisholm, along with Melanie Brown, Geri Halliwell, and Victoria Beckham (née Adams) responded to an advertisement in The Stage magazine. Around 400 women who answered the ad went to Dance Works studios. Halliwell, Chisholm, Beckham and Brown were originally chosen as the members of the group, and then formed a quintet with Emma Bunton. The group felt insecure about the lack of a contract and were frustrated by the direction of Heart Management and broke with them. In 1995, they toured record labels in London and Los Angeles and finally signed a deal with Virgin. Their debut album, Spice, was a huge worldwide commercial success, peaked at number 1 in more than 17 countries across the world, and was certified multi-platinum in 27 countries. Conceptually, the album centered on the idea of Girl Power, and during that time was compared to Beatlemania. In total the album sold 30 million copies worldwide, becoming the biggest-selling album in music history by a girl group and one of the most successful albums of all time. The first single, "Wannabe" reached number 1 in 37 countries, and their subsequent singles – "Say You'll Be There", "2 Become 1", "Who Do You Think You Are" and "Mama" – all peaked at number 1 in the UK.

In 1997, they released their second album, Spiceworld, with the two first singles "Spice Up Your Life" and "Too Much", that entered the UK Albums Chart at number 1, making it the group's all consecutive number 1 hit single, a record of musical groups all time. The album was a global best seller, selling 20 million copies worldwide. The group also starred in their own film, Spiceworld: The Movie, which grossed $100 million at the box office worldwide and became the second most watched movie of the year. The next single, "Stop", peaked at two, breaking the sequence of number 1s, their only single to not reach the top of the charts. "Viva Forever", another number 1, was the last single before Geri Halliwell's departure from the group in May 1998. With four members, the group released "Goodbye", before Christmas in 1998 and when it topped the UK Singles Chart it became their third consecutive Christmas number-one – equalling the record previously set by the Beatles. On 30 November, Canadian artist Bryan Adams, released "When You're Gone" with featured vocals of Chisholm, her debut solo project. The song peaked at number 3 on the UK Singles Chart, spent 15 weeks in the top 40 and received the platinum certified.

1999–2003: Northern Star and Reason

In 1999, Chisholm signed with Virgin and, during the summer, recorded the album Northern Star. She recorded "Ga Ga" from the soundtrack of the film Big Daddy. The song was released as promotional single on 25 June, only in the UK. She also co-wrote and recorded the backing vocals for "(Hey You) Free Up Your Mind", sung by Emma Bunton from the film soundtrack Pokémon: The First Movie. On 27 September, Chisholm released her debut single, "Goin' Down" and peaked at number 4 in the UK and 25 in Australia. The music video was shot in Los Angeles and directed by Giuseppi Capotondi. Her debut album, Northern Star, was released on 18 October 1999, peaked at number 4 and sold 4 million copies worldwide, received triple platinum in the UK, and another seven certifications, including platinum in Germany and Sweden. "Northern Star" was released as a second single and also peaked at number 4. To promote the album, Chisholm embarked on a tour called From Liverpool to Leicester Square, traveling to Australia, the US, Canada, Japan, the UK, Germany, Italy, Spain, France, Netherlands and Denmark, between 27 September and 1 November. In 2000, Chisholm had two songs in film soundtracks, "Suddenly Monday" in Maybe Baby and "Go!" in Whatever It Takes.

After the two singles did not reach the top of the charts, Virgin thought to end the promotion of the album, but decided to release one more single, "Never Be the Same Again", which broke the pop rock sound of the other songs and focused on R&B. The song, featuring TLC member Lisa "Left Eye" Lopes, was released on 20 March 2000 and became her first number 1 single. It was received gold certification in the UK and also peaked at number 1 in Netherlands, New Zealand, Norway, Scotland and Sweden. The song was the 18th best-selling song of 2000 and sold more than a million copies across Europe. After the success of "Never Be the Same Again", the label decided to release two more singles. On 7 August 2000, Virgin released a remix version of "I Turn to You" as the fourth single; the song reached her second number 1 in the UK, Netherlands and Sweden. "I Turn to You" also peaked at number 1 in Austria, Denmark and Dance Club Songs of United States. "If That Were Me" was released as fifth and final single and peaked at number 18. The proceeds from its sale went to the Kandu Arts charity. The North American version of Northern Star was released on 21 August 2000 and included the single versions of "Never Be The Same Again" and "I Turn To You". In late 2000, after the first solo work of members, the Spice Girls released their third and final album, Forever, sporting a new edgier R&B sound. "Holler" and "Let Love Lead the Way" were released as singles on 23 October 2000 and the songs reached number 1 in the UK. The album sold 5 million copies. The group announced that they were beginning an indefinite hiatus. In the same year, the Chinese singer FanFan recorded a Chinese version of "Suddenly Monday" from her debut album FanFan's World.

Chisholm embarked in her first world tour, the Northern Star Tour, between late 2000 and 26 August 2001, to promote her debut album. The tour traveled in 76 dates, 30 countries and 4 continents, just not going to Oceania and South America. The Shepherd's Bush Empire concert was webcast on Chisholm's original website with a special appearance of Bryan Adams. On 4 April 2001, The audio of the Anaheim concert also was webcast on House of Blues' website. A remixed album, entitled Remix Collection, was released only in Japan. In 2001, Chisholm collaborated in the live album of Russell Watson, The Voice – Live, as featured vocals in the songs "Barcelona" and "Aren't You Kind of Glad We Did?".

Chisholm began recording her second album in November 2001. She traveled to the United States to record some songs. During this time, she also recorded "Independence Day" from the film soundtrack Bend It Like Beckham and wrote "Help Me Help You" for Holly Valance, included in her album Footprints. Chisholm, along with Anastacia made an appearance at the 2002 MTV Europe Music Awards to present the award for "Best Song", which was given to P!nk.

Chisholm's second album was postponed to 10 March 2003. Chisholm also took time out due to struggles with clinical depression. On 24 February 2003 the first single from her new album was released, "Here It Comes Again", which reached number 7 in the UK and peaked in the top 20 in Spain and Ireland. She released her second studio album, Reason, on 10 March 2003 and it peaked at number 5, received gold certification in the UK. The label sent Chisholm to promote the album, including several pocket shows. On 24 April 2003, she embarked in the Reason Tour, traveling only in Europe. The second single, "On the Horizon", was released on 2 June 2003. After the previous single, music critics were predicting that this single would redeem Chisholm's chart success, but the song peaked at number 14 and did not help sales.

"Let's Love", was released as a single exclusively in Japan and used for a Toyota Motor Corporation commercial. Alongside promoting the album, Chisholm competed on the reality sports game show The Games. On 11 September 2003, during a taping of The Games, Chisholm competed in a judo match with Turkish-Dutch actress Azra Akin, which resulted in Chisholm injuring her knee. Because of this, the song "Yeh Yeh Yeh", which was planned to be released as the third and final single on 22 September 2003, had to be pushed back because she could not fully promote an upbeat song with an injury. "Melt" was then chosen to be launched along with "Yeh Yeh Yeh" as a double A-side, because she could do a small number of performances. The double single was released on 10 November 2003. The song peaked at number 27. In other countries of Europe, "Melt" wasn't released, only "Yeh Yeh Yeh" as a solo release. After the release of "Melt/Yeh Yeh Yeh", Chisholm added some extra dates to the Reason Tour, and the Avo Session Basel concert was broadcast on 3sat.

2004–2006: Red Girl Records and Beautiful Intentions

On 1 January 2004, Virgin Records dismissed Chisholm after the conflict in previous years about the direction in her solo career. In April 2004, she founded her own label, Red Girl Records, to record and release her own projects. All of Chisolm's activities are decided upon and funded by herself. The label name was inspired by the colours of the football Liverpool F.C., of which Chisholm is a supporter. Nancy Phillips, who had been Chisholm's manager and business partner since the label's inception, retired in 2017.

In June 2004, she embarked in a five-date concert tour, The Barfly Mini-Tour, performed in The Barfly music halls, a series of venues dedicated to independent music. In October 2004, Chisholm finished recording her third album. In an interview, Chisholm said she wanted to create deeper songs using piano, violin and personal themes. On 4 April 2005, Chisholm released "Next Best Superstar" as the lead single of her third album. It was released in three formats: two singles with B-sides – the acoustic version or the B-side "Everything Must Change" – and a remixes EP. The song peaked at number 10 in the UK. On 11 April, she released Beautiful Intentions, her third album and first by Red Girl. It was produced by Greg Haver, Guy Chambers, Paul Boddy and eleven of the twelve songs were written by Chisholm. The album peaked at number 24 in the UK, top 15 other Europeans countries, and was certified gold in Germany and Switzerland.

In support of the album, she embarked at Beautiful Intentions Tour, starting on 16 April in O2 Academy Birmingham, in London, and travelling for twenty-five dates across Europe and Asia. On 1 August, "Better Alone" was released only in the UK as the second single, but did not enter the charts due to the single being available online. "First Day of My Life" was released as single on 30 September in Australia and Europe – except in the UK. The song was not included in the original version of the album, only in the 2006 re-released version, becoming the second international single from Beautiful Intentions. Originally been recorded by Italian tenor Andrea Bocelli, with lyrics in Italian as "Un Nuovo Giorno" for his 2004 eponymous album Andrea. The song peaked at number 1 in Spain, Germany, Switzerland and Portugal, number 2 in Austria, and in the top 30 in Norway, France and Denmark. On 24 February 2006, "Better Alone" was released in Australia and Europe as the third official single, after a limited release in the UK the previous year. The song entered the charts in some countries, peaked at thirty-six in Italy and thirty-three in Switzerland. On 3 April, the album was re-released, including "First Day of My Life" and the music video. In 2006, Chisholm released her first live DVD, Live Hits, recorded on 31 August 2006 at the Bridge in South East, London. The DVD peaked at number 10.

2007–2008: This Time and Spice Girls reunion

In early 2007, Chisholm finished recording her next album and, in March, she released two singles simultaneously. "The Moment You Believe" was released in Europe, except in the UK, and peaked at number 1 in Spain and Portugal, and in the top 20 in Switzerland, Sweden and Germany. Produced and co-written by Peter Vettese, it has been soundbed for the spring advertising campaign for German television show Nur die Liebe Zählt. "I Want Candy" was released only in the UK and Italy, peaking at number 24 and number 9, respectively, and featured on the soundtrack to the film of the same name. The song was a cover version of the Strangeloves song. On 30 March, she released her fourth album, This Time, with thirteen tracks – six written by Chisholm – and other two cover versions: "What If I Stay" and "Don't Let Me Go", by Jill Jackson, from her debut album. The album peaked at number 57 in the UK and number 8 in Switzerland, which was certified gold. "Carolyna" was released as the third single on 8 June. During an interview at Loose Women, Chisholm revealed that she wrote this song after watching a documentary about young adults and teenagers homeless, living in the streets in Seattle. The song peaked at 49 in the UK, and in the top 50 in other countries.

On 28 June 2007, the Spice Girls held a surprise press conference at The O2 Arena announcing that they were reuniting to embark on a worldwide concert tour, The Return of the Spice Girls, starting in Vancouver on 2 December. They received £10 million (approximately $20 million) each for the tour. Filmmaker Bob Smeaton directed an official documentary on the reunion. It was entitled Giving You Everything. At the same time, Chisholm released the fourth single of her album, "This Time", features the B-side "We Love to Entertain You", which was used for 2007's Pro7 Starforce campaign in Germany. The song peaked at number 94 in the UK and 69 in Germany. On 5 November, the Spice Girls released their return single, "Headlines (Friendship Never Ends)", also announced as the official Children in Need charity single and performed at Victoria's Secret Fashion Show. The song peaked at number 11, becoming the first song to not reach the top 10. The music video was directed by Anthony Mandler and the girls used exclusive clothes designed by Roberto Cavalli. They released a compilation album, the Greatest Hits in November, including the singles, the 1997 Pepsi's theme "Move Over" and two new songs, "Voodoo" and "Headlines (Friendship Never Ends)". The compilation sold 6 million copies.

They embarked on the tour on 2 December, traveling for 47 dates until 26 February 2008. The tour is estimated to have grossed over US$70 million and produced $107.2 million in ticket sales and merchandising. The tour won the 2008 Billboard Touring Award. As well as their sell-out tour, the Spice Girls were contracted to appear in Tesco advertisements, for which they were paid £1 million each. After the end of the reunion with the Spice Girls, Chisholm embarked on her fifth tour, the This Time Canadian Tour, in May 2008, performing in nine Canadian cities. On 25 July, "Understand" was released as fifth and final single from This Time only in Canada.

2009–2014: Acting, The Sea and Stages

In 2009, it was planned she would star in a sequel to the 1996 horror film The Craft, but the production was canceled. On 29 June, Chisholm released her second DVD concert, Live at the Hard Rock Cafe, including two previously unreleased songs, "Blue Skies All the Way" and "Paris Burning". The DVD peaked at number 22 in the UK.

In October 2009, she had her acting debut on stage as Mrs Johnstone in the musical Blood Brothers, a new version of the 1983 original production. In an interview, Chisholm revealed that while she had been invited to star in movies and plays . She starred on Blood Brothers until the end of 2010. Chisholm was nominated for the 2010 Laurence Olivier Award for Best Actress in a Musical but she did not win. In the same year she started working on her next album.  On 24 June 2011, "Rock Me" was released as single only in Germany and peaked at number 33 in the country. The song was served as the official theme of the 2011 FIFA Women's World Cup. "Think About It"  was chosen as worldwide single and marked the Chisholm return to dance-pop. The song peaked at number 95 in the UK, 15 in the UK Indie Chart and top 40 in other European countries. The Sea, her fifth studio album, was released on 2 September, and was produced by Andy Chatterley, Cutfather and Peter-John Vettese. The album peaked at number 45 in the UK and also 13 in Switzerland and sixteen in Germany.

Chisholm was mentor assistant in the third season of The X Factor Australia and helped the Mel B team, formed by under 25 years-old girls, during the selection process. The girls did not reach the final. "Weak" was released only in the UK as the third single, charting in the UK Indie Chart. "Let There Be Love" was released as fourth and final single of The Sea in Germany and Switzerland. She also recorded "Viva Life" for the documentary Bash Street. In November, she embarked on her sixth concert tour, The Sea – Live, traveling in Europe during 17 dates. The record of the tour was released as DVD on 27 February 2012.  In her interview for "Ask Melanie C Episode 8" on her YouTube channel, Chisholm said that she "feels very sad as The Sea was a really great album and it wasn't as successful as it deserved to be"  In April, Chisholm was invited by British DJ Jodie Harsh to collaborate on an electronic project. On 13 May they released the EP The Night, including three songs. "Set You Free" was released as a promo single from the EP. In July, she was judge of the ITV talent show Superstar, which searched to find an actor to starring the musical Jesus Christ Superstar. Ben Forster was chosen.

Chisholm co-starred in the musical, playing the role of Mary Magdalene. For her performance Chisholm won Best Supporting Actress in a musical at the Whatsonstage.com Awards. She played the character until 2013. Inspired by the stage, Chisholm began recording an album with musical theatre songs. "I Don't Know How to Love Him" was released on 22 July and peaked at number 20 on UK Indie Chart. The song is a version of Yvonne Elliman from 1970 musical Jesus Christ Superstar. On 7 September, Chisholm released her sixth studio album, Stages, produced by Peter-John Vettese and featuring a collection of show tunes that have been important to Chisholm at various stages of her life. The album peaked at number 50 in the UK and 83 in Ireland. "I Know Him So Well", a version of the Elaine Paige and Barbara Dickson song from the 1984 musical Chess, was released as a single on 11 November, featuring vocals by British singer Emma Bunton. The song peaked at number 153 in the UK and 14 in the UK Indie Chart.

She also was part of The Justice Collective, a super-group of musicians, including Robbie Williams and Paul McCartney, who recorded the charity song "He Ain't Heavy, He's My Brother". The song was released as single on 17 December and peaked at number 1. In 2013, she played Christy in the British comedy film Play Hard. On 18 August, released "Loving You", a collaboration with British singer Matt Cardle. The song peaked at number 14, becoming the first Chisholm's song in the top 15 since 2005. She released her first live album, Live at Shepherd's Bush Empire, on 12 December. On 12 January 2014, Chisholm celebrated her 40th birthday with a special show for the fans, entitled Sporty's Forty, singing her hits and featured Emma Bunton. On 31 March, the Slovakian singer Peter Aristone released "Cool as You", featured vocals of Chisholm, as lead single from 19 Days in Tetbury. Her cover version of "Ain't Got No, I Got Life", by Nina Simone, was included in the compilation Beautiful Cover Versions. She also had a cameo appearance in the music video "Word Up", by Little Mix.

2015–2019: Television, Version of Me and Spice Girls reunion
In 2015, Chisholm joined the judging panel for Asia's Got Talent, along with David Foster, Anggun Cipta, and Vanness Wu. They started the selection in Singapore. During production and selections, Chisholm lived in Malaysia, where the program was recorded. The Asia's Got Talent live shows, with the semifinalists, was aired in March 2015, and ran two months until the finals. On 14 May Chisholm and the judges released a cover version of "Let's Groove", originally by Earth, Wind & Fire, and performed the song in the final. In October, she was mentor assistant in the game competition Bring the Noise. At the same time, she started working on her seventh studio album. The second season of Asia's Got Talent was confirmed for summer 2016, but the project has been discontinued. In 2016, she was featured as a vocalist on "Numb" with Sons Of Sonix, which was stated to be a song from her upcoming album. In September 2016, she made a cameo appearance in KT Tunstall's music video for "Hard Girls". Her seventh album, Version of Me, was released on 21 October 2016.

Chisholm appeared on the Graham Norton Show in May 2017 to perform a duet with Keith Urban for his song, The Fighter. She sang in place of Carrie Underwood, who was the original singer on the duet. On 27 May 2017, Chisholm performed in Mexico City as part of the Classics Fest concert series, which also featured performances by Vanilla Ice and Jenny Berggren of Ace of Base, held at the Auditorio Blackberry. This marked Chisholm's first time performing as a solo artist in Latin America and her first visit in many years since her days with the Spice Girls. Chisholm stated upon her musical return to Mexico, "I haven't been back to Mexico in many years and when I was there it was very brief, so I am excited to return and sing." In June, Chisholm also performed for the first time in Brazil, playing live shows in both Rio de Janeiro and Sao Paulo. In late 2017, Chisholm was co-headliner at Night of the Proms, a 25-concert tour in the Netherlands, Belgium, Germany and Luxembourg. In 2018, she turned her hand to disc jockeying by performing a "90s mix" at various events, and embarked on the Melanie C - Asia Tour 2018.

On 5 November 2018, Chisholm along with the Spice Girls announced a reunion tour. She and ex-bandmates Melanie B, Bunton and Geri Halliwell reunited for the Spice World – 2019 Tour, a 13 date tour of eight cities in the UK and Ireland that was their first for a decade. The tour opened at Croke Park, Dublin on 24 May 2019 and concluded at Wembley Stadium in London on 15 June 2019.

On 6 November 2019, Chisholm released the single "High Heels" which was written with Rae Morris and Benjamin  "Fryars" Garrett and features drag act Sink the Pink. During promotion for the single, Chisholm stated during an interview with The Guardian that she had been working on a new album with artists including Shura and Little Boots.

2020–present: Melanie C and autobiography
On 19 March 2020, Chisholm released "Who I Am", the lead single from her eighth album, Melanie C. Chisholm first performed "Who I Am" live on 21 April 2020 on The Late Late Show with James Corden, where she live streamed her performance from her home due to the COVID-19 pandemic. When asked how she was coping with the lockdown restrictions, she responded, "I'm keeping busy. I'm trying to get my album finished, remotely. I've been trying to stay connected with the fans: I've been doing lots of live Q&A's and streaming." On 13 May 2020, Chisholm sang "Who I Am", among other singles from her career, as part of a "bathroom" gig in aid of WaterAid. On 27 May 2020, Chisholm released "Blame It on Me". "In and Out of Love" was released as the album's third single on 29 July 2020. On 3 August 2020, Chisholm told BBC Music: "Obviously, I'm making a pop-dance record and I'm a mature artist, so I have to accept that some radio stations are not going to be playing me anymore. That's something to overcome. But I want people to enjoy this album, I want people to dance to it, I want people to be empowered by it. And when coronavirus has done one, I want to get out there and perform it live." On 16 September 2020, Chisholm premiered the video for "Fearless" the fourth single off the album, which is a collaboration with UK rapper Nadia Rose. "Meeting Nadia was kismet. I'd seen her on Kathy Burke's documentary series on women and fallen in love with her attitude. As female artists, we have to be fearless. I love this girl." Melanie C was released on 2 October 2020 to critical success. The album entered the UK Albums Chart at number 8, her first top 10 album since Reason in 2003.

On 13 November 2020, Chisholm was featured on "Stop Crying Your Heart Out" as part of the BBC Radio 2's Allstars' Children in Need charity single. Chisholm also made a guest appearance in British singer-songwriter Celeste's music video, "Love is Back", which premiered in January 2021. Chisholm was presented with the "Celebrity Ally" award at the 2021 British LGBT Awards, held in London in August.

On 1 September 2021, the Spice Girls had announced the re-release of Spice to mark their anniversary, titling it Spice25. The deluxe, double album was released on 29 October 2021 and contained remixes, demos and unreleased tracks. The CDs come in an A5 hardback booklet, with a collection of iconic images and a set of six Spice Girls postcards, while the original album is also available on limited edition vinyl and cassette. In an interview with Apple Music for the Spice25 release, Chisholm divulged, "We had [a] risqué song called 'C U Next Tuesday', which was vetoed for the 25th anniversary edition, but I do have plans for it. It sounds like a Lily Allen song; it's absolutely brilliant." The deluxe release saw the album reenter the UK Albums Chart at number five.

On 3 September 2021, Chisholm released a deluxe version of her Melanie C album across all digital and streaming services. Chisholm premiered a video for her cover of "Touch Me" to accompany the new release. That same month, she was announced as a contestant for season 30 of the American series Dancing with the Stars. Chisholm and her professional partner Gleb Savchenko were eliminated on 18 October 2021, finishing in eleventh place. On 26 October 2021, Chisholm performed "2 Become 1" as a duet with Chris Martin of Coldplay for the 8th Annual "We Can Survive" concert by Audacy, which was held at the Hollywood Bowl in Los Angeles.

In November 2021, due to rising concerns over the COVID-19 pandemic in Europe, Chisholm announced the cancellation of her European tour dates in support of her . The following month, she appeared once again as a judge The Voice Kids. Teen Torrin Cuthill, who was mentored by Chisholm, won the three-episode series.

On 27 January 2022, Chisholm announced that her memoir would be published in the latter half of 2022, and will be published by Welbeck Publishing Group. The following month, Chisholm appeared as a guest judge on the first episode of RuPaul's Drag Race: UK Versus the World. The series was filmed in March 2021.

On 22 April 2022, Chisholm was featured on the Tobtok remix to Train's single "AM Gold".

In June 2022, it was announced that Chisholm would appear as a panel judge, later that year, on ITV's Queens for the Night, which would see celebrities drag up. The show aired on 5 November 2022. The following month, a re-recording of "When You're Gone" featuring Chisholm with Bryan Adams was featured on the latter's album of reworked songs, Classic Pt II. Chisholm had made a surprise appearance with Adams at a concert in the same stadium earlier in the month.  That same month, Chisholm headlined Northern Pride in Newcastle, with a DJ set. 

On 19 August 2022, Chisholm announced dates for her Who I Am: My Story book tour, for September and October 2022. 

In an interview with Retro Pop Magazine, published 8 September 2022, Chisholm revealed she had begun work on her next studio album, revealing: "I've done some sessions, there are some new songs and I’ve begun the process for the next album [...] It's had to take a bit of a backseat because writing and promoting the book has been a lot more work than I anticipated." On 15 September 2022, Chisholm's memoir, Who I Am: My Story was released, debuting at number 17 on Amazon's Most Sold Nonfiction Chart. The American version of the tome, The Sporty One: My Life as a Spice Girl was released on 27 September 2022. Chisholm promoted the book in the United States and attended the Cheltenham and Henley Literature Festivals in the United Kingdom. On 27 September, the Spice Girls announced the tracklisting for Spiceworld25, the 25th anniversary edition of their 1997 album Spiceworld. Their 1997 song "Step to Me" was released to streaming platforms the same day. Spiceworld25 was released on 4 November 2022.

On 3 November 2022, Jessie Ware released the "Melanie C remix" to her single "Free Yourself". Eight days later, she was presented with the Inspirational Artist Award at the 2022 Music Week: Women in Music Awards. After receiving a standing ovation, Chisholm said: "It's really nice at this time in my career to be honoured in an industry where sometimes your work is not fully credited or credited to other people [...] I'm seeking out and trying to work with as many women as I can, but we are still way off from it being a level playing field. The glass ceiling is barely cracked but together we will break it." On 14 November, music festival Camp Bestival announced their 2023 lineup, which included Chisholm, alongside Primal Scream, Craig David, Grace Jones, The Kooks, the Human League, and others. On 15 December 2022, Chisholm performed a duet with Alfie Boe as part of Royal Carols: Together at Christmas, hosted by Catherine, Princess of Wales; the show aired nine days later on 24 December on ITV1. On 19 December, she appeared as a guest performing "Stop" on Bunton's Christmas Tour at the Theatre Royal, Drury Lane concert.

In January 2023, Chisholm starred in a dance production at Sadler's Wells Theatre. The show, how did we get here, is choreographed by Julie Cunningham and features Chisholm, Cunningham and Harry Alexander. In March 2023, it was announced that Chisholm would headline that year's Godiva Festival in Coventry, with a host of appearances at festivals in England, Mexico and mainland Europe in the summer of 2023.

Personal life

Chisholm has been open about her experiences with clinical depression and an eating disorder. She spoke of her eating disorder to Contact Music, stating, "I'd hammered the gym for three hours a day. It was a way of running away, not thinking. I felt like a robot. When the papers started calling me 'Sumo Spice', I was only a size 10. But I was so upset by all the criticism, it got worse and I went up to a size 14." In a 2022 interview with The Cut, Chisholm elaborated, "It took me such a long time to recover. I would never want to be arrogant enough to say I'm all better because I'm always aware that they could come back. I've really learned how to look after myself. Sometimes, a healthy work-life balance is impossible to maintain. There are times, if I'm very tired or work's very stressful, I can feel things slipping. We all talk about self-care, but it is so vital for me to keep me on track with everything".

In 1997, Chisholm had a month-long relationship with singer Robbie Williams. In 1998, she dated record producer Jake Davies. Later that year, she was reported to have had a relationship with Red Hot Chili Peppers lead singer Anthony Kiedis, however Chisholm confirmed in 2022 that they had only been friends. Kiedis wrote "Emit Remmus", which is "summer time" spelled backwards, inspired by his relationship with Chisholm. The song was included on the album Californication. In 2000, Chisholm and Jason "J" Brown of the boy band Five had an on-again, off-again relationship.

Chisholm was in a relationship with Thomas Starr for ten years. The couple split in 2012. In February 2009, Chisholm gave birth to her first child, a daughter. In an interview with the BBC, Chisholm admitted that the arrival of her child proved to be a turning point in her life: "Being a mum was so liberating because for the first time in my adult life, it wasn't all about me. It made me not only realise I had a huge responsibility to her but I have a huge responsibility to myself. In being her teacher, I had to treat myself better."

From 2015 to 2022, Chisholm was in a relationship with Joe Marshall, who also acted as her manager. The couple split in August 2022.

In February 2023, Chisholm was reported to be in a relationship with her friend of 25 years, art gallery owner Cassius Colman.

Chisholm is a supporter of Liverpool F.C. and an amateur triathlete, having completed the London Triathlon twice.

Whilst promoting her Who I Am autobiography in September 2022, Chisholm revealed that she had been sexually assaulted in 1997, on the eve of the first Girl Power! Live in Istanbul show in October 1997. Chisholm shared with Elizabeth Day's podcast How to Fail: "I treat[ed] myself to a massage in the hotel and what happened to me, I kind of buried immediately because there were other things to focus on[...] I didn't want to make a fuss but also I didn't have time to deal with it. I felt violated, I felt very vulnerable, I felt embarrassed[...] I do want to talk about it because it has affected me. But I buried it."

Philanthropy
In 2000, all proceeds from sales of her "If That Were Me" single went towards the Kandu Arts charity. In 2012, Chisholm joined the Sport Relief telethon by appearing in a Never Mind the Buzzcocks special. Chisholm also participated in a three-mile "Sport Relief Mile" run. In 2013, Chisholm joined Jack Dee, Dara Ó Briain, Greg James, Chelsee Healey and Philips Idowu in Through Hell and High Water, a Comic Relief challenge which involved British celebrities canoeing the most difficult rapids of the Zambezi River. They raised over £1 million for the charity.  In 2014, Chisholm travelled to Ghana to support a charity campaign by Procter & Gamble that provides African children with clean drinking water. The project involved the use of purification sachets that changes the water from stagnant to drinkable. Chisholm also supported a homeless charity by donating funds raised from her annual calendar.

Artistry

Influences

Chisholm has cited Madonna as her biggest musical influence. She stated: "I think she's inspired me a lot musically, and maybe [in] just the way I present myself. I've always admired how hard she works and what a strong lady she is, so she's always inspired me in that way." Chisholm named Madonna, Blur, Oasis, Suede and the Cardigans as inspirations for her first album.

Voice
Her voice has been described as versatile for different styles and genres, having a distinctive timbre, and "full of flex and snap".

Musical style
Chisholm's music is generally pop and rock.

Cultural impact and legacy

As a Spice Girls member Chisholm was called "Sporty Spice" because she usually wore a tracksuit paired with athletic shoes, wore her long dark hair in a high ponytail, and sported a tough girl attitude as well as tattoos on both of her arms. She has a tattoo on her left arm of a black Christian cross. On her upper-right arm she has tattoos of two Chinese characters: "女" meaning "female" and "力" meaning "force" which together represent the phrase "girl power". She also possessed true athletic abilities, including being able to perform back handsprings. The term "Cool Britannia" became prominent in the media and represented the new political and social climate that was emerging with the advances made by New Labour and the new UK Prime Minister Tony Blair.
Although by no means responsible for the onset of "Cool Britannia", the arrival of the Spice Girls added to the new image and re-branding of Britain, and underlined the growing world popularity of British, rather than American, pop music.

The Spice Girls broke onto the music scene at a time when alternative rock, hip-hop and R&B dominated global music charts. The modern pop phenomenon that the Spice Girls created by targeting early members of Generation Y was credited with changing the global music landscape, bringing about the global wave of late-1990s and early-2000s teen pop acts such as Hanson, Britney Spears, Christina Aguilera and NSYNC. The Spice Girls have also been credited with paving the way for the girl groups and female pop singers that have come after them. In the UK, they are credited for their massive commercial breakthrough in the previously male-dominated pop music scene,  leading to the widespread formation of new girl groups in the late 1990s and early 2000s including All Saints, B*Witched, Atomic Kitten, Girls Aloud and Sugababes, hoping to emulate the Spice Girls' success. The Pussycat Dolls, 2NE1, Girls' Generation, Little Mix, Fifth Harmony, Lady Gaga, Jess Glynne, Alexandra Burke, Kim Petras, Charli XCX, Rita Ora, Demi Lovato Carly Rae Jepsen, Regine Velasquez, MØ, Billie Eilish and Adele credits the Spice Girls as a major influence.

Some songs from Northern Star have appeared in films, such as "Ga Ga" which is heard in Charmed and Big Daddy. The song "Go" makes an appearance in Whatever It Takes. "Suddenly Monday" appears in Maybe Baby and on its soundtrack. After the song gained popularity, "I Turn to You" was featured in the film Bend It Like Beckham. It was covered by Darkseed on "Ultimate Darkness", by Machinae Supremacy on "Webography", and by Wig Wam on 667.. The Neighbour of the Beast. The song was also featured in the musical Viva Forever!, a musical show based on the songs of the Spice Girls. Some songs have also been covered by international artists such as Christine Fan, who covered and translated "Suddenly Monday" in Chinese for her debut album FanFan's World, and Dutch pop singer Do who covered the Japanese bonus-track "Follow Me", for her album of the same name. The single "First Day of My Life" was originally recorded by Italian tenor Andrea Bocelli, with lyrics in Italian as "Un Nuovo Giorno" (A new day) for his 2004 album Andrea, and he also released it as a single the same year. Chisolm's version of the single was a success in German-speaking countries because it was used as the title song of the German soap opera telenovela Wege zum Glück. At the time of The Seas release, the lead single "Rock Me" served as the official theme song for German TV channel ZDF's coverage of the 2011 FIFA Women's World Cup.

Discography

Studio albums 
 Northern Star (1999)
 Reason (2003)
 Beautiful Intentions (2005)
 This Time (2007)
 The Sea (2011)
 Stages (2012)
 Version of Me (2016)
 Melanie C (2020)

Filmography

Stage

Concert tours

Headlining
 From Liverpool to Leicester Square (1999)
 Northern Star Tour (2000–01)
 Reason Tour (2003)
 The Barfly Mini-Tour (2004)
 Beautiful Intentions Tour (2005)
 This Time Canadian Tour (2008)
 The Sea – Live (2011–12)
 Version of Me UK & Ireland Tour (2017)
 Version of Me Europe Tour (2017)
 Version of Me Festival Tour (2017–2018)
 Global Pride Tour (2019)
 Colors and Light Live Stream (2020)
 Melanie C Tour (2022)
 Melanie C Summer Festival Tour (2023)

Fixed special guest
 The Christmas Tour  (2014)

Published works

Awards and nominations

Notes

References

External links

 
1974 births
Living people
20th-century English singers
20th-century English women singers
21st-century English singers
21st-century English women singers
Alumni of Bird College
Bonnier Amigo Music Group artists
Dance-pop musicians
English female dancers
English female models
English memoirists
English people of Irish descent
English people of Scottish descent
English philanthropists
English rock singers
English television personalities
English women guitarists
English women pop singers
English women singer-songwriters
Participants in American reality television series
People from Whiston, Merseyside
Singers from Merseyside
Spice Girls members
Virgin Records artists
Women rock singers